Move is a 2020 docuseries starring Jon Boogz, Lil Buck and Israel Galván.

Cast 
 Jon Boogz
 Lil Buck
 Israel Galván
 Akram Khan
 Ohad Naharin
 Kimiko Versatile

Theatre and dance scholar Octavian Saiu, who hosted dialogues with three of the artists featured in the series, praised the programme for “disseminating information about contemporary dance to a wide audience”.

Episodes

Release 
Move was released on October 23, 2020, on Netflix.

References

External links 
 
 

Netflix original documentary television series
English-language Netflix original programming